The White Lions is a 1981 American drama film directed by Mel Stuart and starring Michael York and Glynnis O'Connor.

Premise
A college professor, his wife, and daughter go to the wilds of Africa to live and study the rare white lions of the region.

Cast
Michael York as Chris McBride
Glynnis O'Connor as Jeannie McBride
Donald Moffat as Vreeland
J.A. Preston as Aniel
Roger E. Mosley as John Kani
Lauri Lynn Myers as Laura McBride
Tom Taylor as Mr. Gleason
Louis Heshimu White III as Intern
Larry Drake as Fiske
Norma Young as Prof. Thorndike
David Haney as Dr. Ford
Columbia Dowell as Mrs. Gleason
Charles Pace as Ranger
Hugh Gorrian as Dr. Uffner
Sally Norvell as Sarah (as Sarah Norvell)
William H. Burkett as Man
Keith Alcorn as College student (uncredited)

References

External links

1981 films
1981 drama films
American drama films
Films about lions
Films shot in Texas
Films set in South Africa
Universal Pictures films
Films directed by Mel Stuart
1980s English-language films
1980s American films